David Lincoln Rowland (February 12, 1924 – August 13, 2010) was an American industrial designer noted for inventing the 40/4 Chair.

Early life and education
David Lincoln Rowland was born on February 12, 1924, in Los Angeles, the only child of Neva Chilberg Rowland, a violinist and W. Earl Rowland, an artist, lecturer and teacher. In 1936 he moved with his parents to Stockton, California where his father became director of the Haggin Museum. In the summer of 1940, when he was 16, he took a course with László Moholy-Nagy, one of the founders of The Bauhaus school, at Mills College in Oakland, California on Basic Bauhaus Design.  After graduation from Stockton High School in 1942, he studied drafting, and worked as a draftsman for the Rheem Manufacturing Co., drawing plans for war munitions, before entering military service in World War II.

From 1943 through 1945 Rowland was a 1st Lieutenant in the United States Army Air Corps, the 8th Air Force, 94th Bomb Group, and 333rd Squadron, as a B17 (“Flying Fortress”) pilot.  He was stationed in Bury St. Edmunds, England and conducted 22 combat missions.  Rowland was awarded the Air Medal with several clusters.

After the end of the war, Rowland studied at Principia College in Elsah, Illinois, graduating in 1949. He went on to study industrial design at the University of Southern California and afterwards at Cranbrook Academy of Art in Bloomfield Hills, Michigan, earning a master's degree in Industrial Design in 1951.

Early career
After graduating, Rowland worked outside of the design field and worked on his own designs in his spare time. He later took a job as head draftsman doing architectural renderings for Norman Bel Geddes.

Rowland also designed commercial interiors, including a Transparent Chair for the No-Sag Spring Co., a Zig Zag Cantilever Chair that was exhibited in 11th Milan Triennale in 1957  and a Drain Dry Cushion, licensed to Lee Woodard & Sons.  In 1956, the royalty income from the Drain Dry Cushion allowed Rowland to open his own office.

The 40/4 chair

Rowland developed the 40/4 Chair over a period of 8 years and was awarded a patent on it in 1963.

Initially, Rowland showed chair to many companies in an effort to license the design.  In 1961, Florence Knoll licensed the chair for her company, Knoll Associates, however canceled a license after six months.  Rowland later showed the chair to Davis Allen, head of interior design at the architectural firm of Skidmore, Owings & Merrill (SOM).  Allen requested 17,000 chairs for the a campus SOM was designing for the University of Illinois at Chicago (UIC).  To fulfill the request, Rowland licensed the design to General Fireproofing Co. (GF) in Youngstown, Ohio.  In May 1965, While the first order for was still being produced, 250 chairs were hand assembled and installed in the Museum of Modern Art in New York City for the opening of its new wing. MOMA also included the 40/4 in its permanent collection.

The 40/4 was an immediate success. It won the grand prize at the 13th Milan Triennale, and has been included in museum collections and exhibitions internationally.

In the book the Modern Chair, Clement Meadmore described the chair as having “beautiful simplicity and total appropriateness.” Twenty five hundred 40/4s were installed in St. Paul's Cathedral in London in 1973, site of Prince Charles and Princess Diana's wedding, and remain in use. The chair has been in continuous production since its introduction and has sold over 8 million units.

General Fireproofing held the license for the chair from 1963 until 2002 when the company was taken over by OSI Furniture LLC.  In 2013, Howe Europe, (now Howe a/s), of Denmark, which had had a sublicense to the chair in Europe, Africa, Australia, New Zealand and Asia (except for Indonesia) acquired the license for the 40/4 in the United States and Canada.

In 2010 Contract Design Magazine named the 40/4 number one of the top 10 commercial interiors products of the past 50 years.

Personal life
Rowland  married Miss Erwin Wassum, a crafts designer, in 1971.  They lived in New York City, before moving to Marion, Virginia in 2001.

Honors and awards

 37 U.S. Patents and numerous international patents
 1964 Grand Prix, 13th Milan Triennale for '40/4 Chair'
 "40/4 Chair” named #1 of The Top 10 Commercial Interiors Products of the Past 50 Years by Contract Design Magazine, 2010
 Design in America:  The Cranbrook Vision. 1984 Exhibition at the Metropolitan  Museum in New York.
 Design in America: The Cranbrook Vision,1984 book<
 International Council of Societies of Industrial Design (ICSID) Exhibition 1980
 Best of Competition Gold Medal, Institute of Business Designers (IBD) and Contract Magazine 1979
 Design in America:  The Cranbrook Vision. 1984 Exhibition at the Metropolitan  Museum in New York.
 Gold Award for Product Design Excellence (Seating), Institute of Business  Designers (IBD) and Contract Magazine 1979, 
 Meadmoore, The Modern Chair, 1975 
 Austrian Government Gold Medal Award for Furniture 1968 
 Master Design Award 1965, Product Engineering Magazine 
 National Cotton Batting InstituteAward, 1958 for chair design
 Illuminating Engineering Society Award, for lighting design, 1951
 Best Piece of Business Furniture award from American Institute of Designers (AID)

Museum Collections Containing Rowland's Work
The Museum of Modern Art, New York, New York 
The Metropolitan Museum of Art, New York, New York 
Philadelphia Museum of Art, Philadelphia, Pennsylvania 
The Art Institute of Chicago, Chicago, Illinois 
Brooklyn Museum, Brooklyn, New York 
Palais du Louvre, Musée des Arts Decoratifs, Paris,. France
Design Museum, London, England 
Victoria and Albert Museum, London 
Museu de Arte Moderna, Rio de Janeiro, Brazil

Education
Die Neue Sammlung, Munich, Germany

Patents
1956  Furniture Seating
1956  Automobile License Plate and Fuel Tank Filler Spout Arrangement
1957  Weatherproof Cushion
1957  Spring Assembly
1963  Compactly Stackable Chair
1966  Compactly Stackable Chair
1966  Compactly Stackable Chair
1967  Dolly for Stacking Chairs
1968  Compactly Stackable Chair
1969  Nested Armchair
1969  Collapsible and Stackable Paper Ash Receptacle for Cigarettes
1968  Dispensing Package for Paper-Cup Ashtrays and the Like
1972  Ash Tray
1972  Seating Unit
1973  Furniture for Seating People
1973  Seating and Sub-Assembly for Seats and Backs
1973  Seating Unit
1973  Seating and Sub-Assembly for Seats and Back and Method for Making Same
1973  Seating and Sub-Assembly for Seats and Backs
1974  Folding Chair
1974  Stackable Seating Units
1981  Stackable Chairs
1982  Chair and seat-back unit therefor
1983  Stackable Armchair
1984  Stackable Armchair
1987  Stackable Armchair
1994  Tubular Pedestal Assembly
2005  Panel
2011  Improved Panel
1981  Combined Seat and Backrest Unit for a Chair
1982  Armchair
1982  Chair
1983  Counter Armchair
1983  Armchair
1985  Tablet-Arm Chair
1993  Chair
2005  Stacking Chair

References

External links
 David Rowland Official Website
 Howe's Website for the 40/4 Chair

1924 births
2010 deaths
American industrial designers
United States Army personnel of World War II
Cranbrook Educational Community alumni
People from Los Angeles
People from Stockton, California
People from New York City
People from Marion, Virginia
Principia College alumni
United States Army Air Forces soldiers
Military personnel from California
American furniture makers
American Christian Scientists